Kazpost is the national postal service of Kazakhstan.

History

Independent Kazakhstan

Since 1992, Kazakhstan is a member of the Universal Postal Union. April 5, 1993 according to the Cabinet of Kazakhstan "On improving the management structure the communications industry of the Republic of Kazakhstan" were divided mail and telecommunications. In November 1995 the State -mail has become an independent economic entity, transforming itself into a Republican state enterprise Post services.

In the summer of 1999 was a radical reform of mail began after the decision of the Government of Kazakhstan on May 27, 1999, "On measures to stabilize and financial health of the postal industry": On December 20, 1999, RGPPS was transformed into a Joint Stock Company Kazpost Wholly owned by the state, it was registered with a total capital of 903.66 million tenge initial registered capital of the company was formed only in the form of buildings and equipment. The situation was aggravated by a severe financial condition of the postal industry - RGPPS payable for the period from 1993 to 2000, before the pension funds, wages and taxes was 140 million tenge, the amount of accumulated losses from previous years over the years amounted to more than 250.6 million tenge.

Development Programme of the postal industry and the formation of the postal savings system of 2000–2003, laid the foundation in Kazakhstan postal savings system based on the retail network of post offices. As a source of funding for its implementation has served the Islamic Development Bank loan in the amount of U.S. $9 million under the state guarantees, domestic bond issue in the amount of 1.4 billion tenge, as well as a steady increase in the government of the authorized capital of the company. Kazakhstan was the first country in the CIS developed postal savings system. Results of Operations KazPost  to create a full postal savings system were found to be successful Regional Commonwealth of Communications.

In October 2006, in Alma-Ata was established enterprise Elektronpost.kz  for providing logistics information, including printing and mailing konvertovaniya

See also
Postage stamps and postal history of Kazakhstan
Media of Kazakhstan
Communications in Kazakhstan

External links
 Official website

References

Postal organizations
Communications in Kazakhstan
Government-owned companies of Kazakhstan
Transport companies established in 1883